Champion is a 2002 South Korean film directed by Kwak Kyung-taek, about South Korean boxer Duk Koo Kim, portrayed by Yu Oh-seong.

Background
A biopic, Champion details the life of Duk Koo Kim, South Korea's most popular boxer, who, in his rise to international fame, faced the reigning lightweight champion Ray Mancini at Caesar's Palace in Las Vegas, Nevada on November 13, 1982. Kim ultimately lost the match after fourteen rounds, and within minutes, dropped into a coma from which he never recovered. The match changed boxing rules around the world; and affected South Korea especially.

Cast
Yu Oh-seong - Kim Deuk-gu
Chae Min-seo - Lee Kyeong-mi
Yun Seung-won - Kim, Hyeon-ji
Jung Doo-hong - Lee Sang-bok
Kim Byeong-seo - Park Jong-pal
Ji Dae-han - Hwang Jun-seok
Shin Jung-geun - Kim Yun-gu
Kim Hyun-sook - bus driver
Han Dae-gwan - man with evenly parted hair 3
Matthew Ray Phillips - Ray “Boom-Boom” Mancini

References

External links 
 

2002 films
2000s biographical films
2000s Korean-language films
South Korean biographical films
Films directed by Kwak Kyung-taek
South Korean boxing films
Biographical action films
2000s South Korean films